Bradley High School may refer to one of the following high schools in the United States:

 Bradley High School (Arkansas), based in Bradley, Arkansas
 Bradley Central High School, based in Cleveland, Tennessee
 Hilliard Bradley High School, based in Hilliard, Ohio
 Bradlee School, based in Andover, Massachusetts.

See also
 Bradley County Schools
 Bradley School District